Ashford is a former electorate for the South Australian Legislative Assembly which included many of Adelaide's inner south western suburbs. The district formed part of three federal electorates: the Division of Hindmarsh, the Division of Boothby, and the Division of Adelaide. The former electorate included the suburbs of  Ashford, Black Forest, Camden Park, Clarence Gardens, Clarence Park, Cumberland Park, Everard Park, Forestville, Glandore, Keswick, Kings Park, Novar Gardens and Plympton as well as parts of Edwardstown, Goodwood, Millswood, Plympton Park, South Plympton and Wayville.

The electorate's name derives from the name given by early settler Charles George Everard to his property 'Ashford' in 1838 that was thought to have the best orchard in the colony. The name was also given to a suburb within the electorate. The district of Hanson was renamed to Ashford at the 2002 election. Hanson was re-drawn from a marginal Liberal to a marginal Labor electorate at the 1993 election. Often redistributed in all directions, particularly north and east, the only constant suburb in Ashford and Hanson has been the western half of Plympton. Incumbent Liberal MP Heini Becker moved to Peake, now West Torrens, however Ashford was still narrowly won by Liberal candidate Stewart Leggett. Up until its abolition, the seat was held by Labor member Steph Key who defeated Leggett at the 1997 election. A redistribution prior to the 2014 election saw Labor's margin significantly reduced from 4.8 percent to 0.6 percent however Labor retained the seat with an increased margin of 1.9 percent.

Ashford was replaced by Badcoe at the 2018 election; with a significant increase to the Labor margin in the seat resulting from the 2016 electoral redistribution. Key announced in February 2017 that she would retire from parliament as of the 2018 election.

Members for Ashford

Election results

Notes

References
 ABC profile for Ashford: 2014
 ECSA profile for Ashford: 2014
 Poll Bludger profile for Ashford: 2014

Former electoral districts of South Australia
2002 establishments in Australia
2018 disestablishments in Australia
Constituencies established in 2002
Constituencies disestablished in 2018